Krimo Rebih ( – ) was a professional Algerian footballer who played as a forward.

Life and career
Krimo was born on 1 May 1932 at The Casbah. He began his career at the Ideal of Algiers in 1946. From 1948-1952, he played at the USMA. Called to military service in France, he will carry the colors of Belfort and Limoges in corporate clubs. In 1956, he went to Libya to serve the Ittihad Tripoli. But it is Hamam Lif in Tunisia that affirm being a key element of the training led by the Bey family. Krimo was one of the founders of the NLA team, composed mainly of players from Algerian Tunisian clubs. At independence, he signed for USM Alger, his old love he never left until 1970, at the age of 38 years. Algiers was the club as honorary president Ahmed Ben Bella who attended some of the meetings and was close to the players. Krimo never forced their ability to dribble a whole regiment of defenders. It is not by chance that he was nicknamed the Prince of Hamam Lif.

Clubs

Honours
 Championnat National
 Winner: 1962-63

References

External links
Profile on djazairess.com site

1932 births
2012 deaths
Algerian footballers
Algeria international footballers
Footballers from Algiers
USM Alger players
Association football forwards
21st-century Algerian people